WEGH (107.3 FM, "Eagle 107") is a commercial FM radio station licensed to serve Northumberland, Pennsylvania. The station is owned by Sunbury Broadcasting Corporation and broadcasts a classic rock format.

WEGH airs Bucknell University Bison football and basketball games, Selinsgrove Area High School Seals football games and Philadelphia Eagles football. New in the Spring of 2020 is the addition of Philadelphia Phillies Baseball.

History
Originally assigned the WAFH call sign by the FCC in 1993, the station signed on for the first time in 1994 as WKOK-FM, simulcasting the programming of WKOK. On March 10, 1998, the station's call sign was changed to WEGH and one month later, on April 18, the station re-branded as Eagle 107 with its "Rock ‘N Roll for Adults" slogan.

References

External links

EGH
Classic rock radio stations in the United States
Radio stations established in 1994
1994 establishments in Pennsylvania